Michael Henry Moroski (born September 4, 1957) is an American football coach and former player.  He is the football head coach at College of Idaho.  Moroski played eight seasons in the National Football League (NFL) with the Atlanta Falcons, the Houston Oilers and the San Francisco 49ers.

College career
Moroski attended the University of California at Davis, where he played quarterback for the UC Davis Aggies football team under head coach Jim Sochor before graduating in 1979.  He was also a pitcher on the Aggies baseball team.

Moroski was enshrined into the Cal Aggie Athletic Hall of Fame in 1985.

Professional career 
Moroski played in every game of each of the 1983 and 1984 seasons as well as 15 in 1986.  He threw for over 1,200 yards in 1984.  In his final season, when he played for the 49ers, Moroski threw Jerry Rice one of his NFL record 197 touchdown receptions.

Coaching career
Moroski was a coach at his alma mater, UC Davis, starting in 1988, not long after the completion of his NFL career.  He started as the junior varsity coach and worked his way up to offensive coordinator.  He served in that role for more than 15 years. Moroski also coached the offensive line for UC Davis.

Moroski was announced as the new head football coach for the College of Idaho on January 9, 2013.

Personal life
Moroski went to Novato High School. He has four children—Nate, Will, Ben, and Emmie—and lives with his wife, Cathie, in Caldwell, Idaho.

Head coaching record

College

References

External links
 College of Idaho profile
 

1957 births
Living people
American football quarterbacks
Baseball pitchers
Atlanta Falcons players
College of Idaho Coyotes football coaches
Houston Oilers players
San Francisco 49ers players
UC Davis Aggies baseball players
UC Davis Aggies football coaches
UC Davis Aggies football players
People from Novato, California
Coaches of American football from California
Players of American football from Bakersfield, California
Baseball players from California